Cirrhoscyllium is a genus of carpetsharks in the family Parascylliidae.

Species
 Cirrhoscyllium expolitum H. M. Smith & Radcliffe, 1913 (barbelthroat carpetshark)
 Cirrhoscyllium formosanum Teng, 1959 (Taiwan saddled carpetshark)
 Cirrhoscyllium japonicum Kamohara, 1943 (saddle carpetshark)

References
 

 
Parascylliidae
Shark genera
Taxa named by Hugh McCormick Smith
Taxa named by Lewis Radcliffe